Sheikh Shah Alam is an Indian politician. In 2001 and 2011 he was elected as MLA of Goalpara West Vidhan Sabha Constituency in Assam Legislative Assembly. He was an All India United Democratic Front politician. He joined Asom Gana Parishad on 5 July 2019.

References

Year of birth missing (living people)
All India United Democratic Front politicians
Living people
Asom Gana Parishad politicians
Nationalist Congress Party politicians